Pantana is a genus of tussock moths in the family Erebidae. The genus was erected by Francis Walker in 1855.

Species
The following species are included in the genus.

References

Lymantriinae
Moth genera